HSBC Bank (China) Company Limited (often abbreviated as ) was one of the first foreign banks to incorporate locally in mainland China in 2007. It is part of the worldwide HSBC Group and is wholly owned by Hong Kong-based HSBC (Hong Kong).

History of HSBC China

The Hongkong and Shanghai Banking Corporation established its Shanghai branch office on 3 April 1865, previous to other upstarts of HSBC, and indeed, as part of the historic English investment of Eastern Asian nations in the 19th century. Apart from the period 1941–1945, during which Japan forced HSBC and other foreign-invested banks to leave the local market, it has had a continuous presence in the city. HSBC was historically housed in one of the largest and most impressive buildings on The Bund, Shanghai's boulevard formerly known as the "Wall Street of the Orient".

In April 1955, HSBC handed over this office to the Communist government, and its activities were continued in rented premises. Its activities were mainly in inward remittances and export bills until the economic reforms of the late 1970s. Chinese authorities had offered to lease HSBC its old headquarters on The Bund in 1995 but the offer was turned down. In 2000, HSBC China moved into HSBC Tower across the river in the Pudong area of Shanghai. In 2010, HSBC China's headquarters moved out of the HSBC Tower and moved into HSBC Building in Shanghai IFC.

In July 2022, HSBC became the first foreign lender to open a Chinese Communist Party committee in its Chinese investment banking subsidiary. The subsidiary, HSBC Qianhai Securities, is a 90% HSBC-owned joint venture.

Chinese UK banking

In mainland China, HSBC has the largest services network among foreign banks. The bank offers a full range of services that cater to both middle-class individuals and to business-oriented individuals as well, from a robust network of 37 main branches, and 23 smaller branches.

HSBC having invested over US$5 billion in select mainland financial services entities and in the growth of its own operations, including a 19.90% stake in Bank of Communications, a 16.8% stake in Ping An Insurance, and an 8% stake in Bank of Shanghai.

Local incorporation

The China Banking Regulatory Commission announced on 24 December 2006 its approval for foreign banks to start their preparatory work for setting up local incorporations in mainland China. These foreign banks can launch the RMB retail business of below RMB1 million for Chinese domestic citizens after the inspection and confirmation by the relevant banking regulatory administration authorities. The Hongkong and Shanghai Banking Corporation was one of nine foreign banks to have applied for the incorporation. On 1 April 2007, the mainland China offices of The Hongkong and Shanghai Banking Corporation transferred to its subsidiary HSBC Bank (China), and it started operations on 2 April. The registered capital and paid-up capital of HSBC Bank (China) is equivalent to RMB8 billion. However, The Hongkong and Shanghai Banking Corporation still has a branch in Shanghai, which conducts foreign currency wholesale banking business.

See also

HSBC Group
The Hongkong and Shanghai Banking Corporation
HSBC Rural Bank

References

External links
 HSBC Bank (China) Company Limited
 HSBC branches and services in China

China
Banks of China
Banks established in 2007
2007 establishments in China
Chinese subsidiaries of foreign companies